is a Japanese former competitive figure skater. He is the 2011 NRW Trophy bronze medalist, the 2013 Bavarian Open silver medalist, a two-time medalist on the ISU Junior Grand Prix series, and the 2011 Japan junior national champion.

Career
Nakamura began skating at age 7. He debuted on the ISU Junior Grand Prix (JGP) series in 2007. In 2009, he won medals at both of his JGP assignments — silver in the United States and bronze in Turkey. His results qualified him for the ISU Junior Grand Prix Final, where he finished eighth. After ranking seventh on the senior level at the Japan Championships, he was assigned to the 2010 Four Continents Championships and placed 15th.

In the 2010–11 season, Nakamura finished off the podium at his JGP events but won the Japan Junior Championships. He was sent to the 2011 World Junior Championships and finished 14th.

Nakamura won bronze at the 2011 NRW Trophy and silver at the 2013 Bavarian Open.

Programs

Competitive highlights 
JGP: Junior Grand Prix

References

External links 

 

Japanese male single skaters
1991 births
Living people
People from Matsudo